Milica Stojadinovic-Srpkinja (1828–1878) was a Serbian poet, sometimes called "the greatest female Serbian poet of the 19th century".

Career
As her fame spread beyond the confines of Serbian culture of the Austrian Empire, Prince Mihailo Obrenović would invite her to court when she came to Belgrade and Vienna-based anthropologist and poet Johann Gabriel Seidl devoted a poem to her.

She corresponded extensively with writers Đorđe Rajković (1825–1886), Ljubomir Nenadović, Vuk Stefanović Karadžić and his daughter Wilhelmine/Mina, Božena Němcová, and with Ludwig August von Frankl. In 1891 an almanach Die Dioskuren was issued in Vienna by Ludwig von Frankl with a collection of letters written by Milica Stojadinović.

Her work, though, has been mostly out of the public eye and almost forgotten except by literary experts for most of the 20th century, first during fin-de-siècle modernist poeticism as an outdated poetic form of pre-1870s, and later, under Communist rule as an unacceptable expression of patriotism for only one of the six nations of Yugoslavia (namely: Serbian).

After Josip Broz Tito's death the awareness of her work was revived, and in the last quarter of a century a four-day poetry memorial is convened annually in Novi Sad in her honour, where a poetry prize bearing her name is awarded to prominent poets from Serbia.

See also
 Eustahija Arsić
 Ana Marija Marović
 Princess Anka Obrenović
 Staka Skenderova
 Draga Dejanović

Notes

References

Jovan Skerlić, Istorija Nove Srpske Književnosti / History of Modern Serbian Literature (Belgrade, 1914, 1921), p. 208. Her biography was translated from Skerlić's Serbian into English for this entry in the Wikipedia.

External links
 

1830 births
1878 deaths
19th-century Serbian poets
19th-century Serbian women
19th-century Serbian women writers
People from Petrovaradin
Serbian women poets
Eastern Orthodox Christians from Serbia
Burials in Požarevac